Rowland Park is a park and sports complex featuring soccer, baseball, and softball facilities.  It is located in South Brunswick, New Jersey with a Cranbury, NJ address and is the home of the New Jersey Blaze of the Women's Premier Soccer League (WPSL).

External links
 Rowland Park

Parks in Middlesex County, New Jersey
Soccer venues in New Jersey
Cranbury, New Jersey
Defunct National Premier Soccer League stadiums